Soay Beag (Scottish Gaelic: Sòdhaigh Beag) is a small, uninhabited tidal island in West Loch Tarbert, between the northern and southern parts of Harris. Soay Beag is separated from the southwest coast of North Harris by the Soay Sound. The island is located immediately to the northwest of the larger Soay Mòr, which is accessible on foot at low tide. Soay Beag's highest elevation is 37m (121 feet).

References 
 Gazetteer for Scotland

Islands off Lewis and Harris
Tidal islands of Scotland
Harris, Outer Hebrides
Uninhabited islands of the Outer Hebrides